The 2008 New Mexico Republican presidential primary took place on June 3, 2008. All 29 National delegates were awarded to John McCain.

Results

See also
 2008 New Mexico Democratic primary
 2008 Republican Party presidential primaries

External links
 "New Mexico Republican Party Events Calendar - June 2008"

References

New Mexico
2008 New Mexico elections
New Mexico Republican primaries